The 1986 Augustana (Illinois) Vikings football team was an American football team that represented Augustana College as a member of the College Conference of Illinois and Wisconsin (CCIW) during the 1986 NCAA Division III football season. In their eighth season under head coach Bob Reade, the Vikings compiled a 12–0–1 record and won the CCIW championship. It was Augustana's fourth consecutive Division III national championship.

The team's statistical leaders included Greg Wallace with 547 passing yards, Brad Price with 1,218 rushing yards and 108 points scored, and Eric Welgat with 398 receiving yards.

They played their home games at Ericson Field in Rock Island, Illinois.

Schedule

References

Augustana
Augustana (Illinois) Vikings football seasons
NCAA Division III Football Champions
College football undefeated seasons
Augustana (Illinois) Vikings football